The 1983 Texas Longhorns football team represented the University of Texas at Austin in the 1983 NCAA Division I-A football season.  The Longhorns finished the regular season with an 11–0 record and lost to Georgia in the Cotton Bowl Classic.

Schedule

References

Texas
Texas Longhorns football seasons
Southwest Conference football champion seasons
Texas Longhorns football